Sojek is a small settlement in the Municipality of Slovenske Konjice in eastern Slovenia. It lies dispersed on the southern slopes of the Mount Konjice hills southwest of Slovenske Konjice. The area of the entire Municipality of Slovenske Konjice was traditionally part of the Styria region and is now included in the Savinja Statistical Region.

References

External links
Sojek at Geopedia

Populated places in the Municipality of Slovenske Konjice